José Guimarães (born 2 February 1965) is a Portuguese fencer. He competed in the individual foil event at the 1992 Summer Olympics.

References

External links
 

1965 births
Living people
Portuguese male foil fencers
Olympic fencers of Portugal
Fencers at the 1992 Summer Olympics